Kristian Nökkvi Hlynsson (born 23 January 2004) is a professional footballer who plays as a midfielder for Jong Ajax. Born in Denmark, he represents Iceland at youth level.

Club career
Kristian started his career with Breiðablik before transferring to Ajax in January 2020.

International career
Kristian has featured for the under-15, under-16, under-17, under-19 and under-21 Icelandic youth national teams.

Personal life
Kristian is the younger brother of AC Horsens player Ágúst Hlynsson.

References

External links

2004 births
Living people
Footballers from Odense
Kristian Hlynsson
Kristian Hlynsson
Danish men's footballers
Danish people of Icelandic descent
Kristian Hlynsson
Expatriate footballers in the Netherlands
Association football midfielders
Kristian Hlynsson
Kristian Hlynsson
Jong Ajax players
Eerste Divisie players